During the 2007–08 German football season, Bayer 04 Leverkusen competed in the Bundesliga.

Season summary
Despite recording an identical league record to the previous season, Leverkusen dropped to 7th, the first time they had failed to qualify for Europe in five seasons. Michael Skibbe was sacked as a result, and was replaced by Greuther Fürth manager Bruno Labbadia.

First-team squad
Squad at end of season

Left club during season

References

Notes

Bayer 04 Leverkusen
Bayer 04 Leverkusen seasons